Jennifer Hermoso Fuentes (born 9 May 1990) is a Spanish professional footballer who plays for Liga MX Femenil club CF Pachuca and for the Spain women's national team. She is the all-time top scorer for both Barcelona and Spain.

Hermoso developed through the youth teams of her hometown club Atlético Madrid, where she stayed for eight years before continuing onto Rayo Vallecano. Hermoso won her first senior title with Rayo in 2011, and in 2013, made her first international move to Tyresö FF in Sweden. Months later, she competed in the UEFA Women's Euro 2013 with Spain, scoring her first competitive international goal in a group stage win against England.

Hermoso moved to FC Barcelona in 2014, where she advanced her position from attacking midfielder to false 9. Her positional change turned her to a prolific goalscorer, as she earned two Pichichi titles as the Spanish league's top scorer as well as two league titles and two Copas de la Reina. She also competed with Spain at the 2015 FIFA Women's World Cup, Spain's first ever participation in the tournament. After exiting Barcelona in 2017, Hermoso went abroad to PSG and then returned to Spain in the 2018–19 season to play for the club where she developed, Atlético Madrid. She won her third Pichichi title and fourth league title there.

Hermoso rejoined FC Barcelona in 2019 following Spain's exit from the 2019 FIFA Women's World Cup tournament, where she finished as Spain's top scorer. Since her return to Barcelona, she has won three league titles, two Copas de la Reina, and the 2020–21 UEFA Women's Champions League, alongside the continental treble that same season. Individually, she finished the 2019–20 and 2020–21 league seasons as the Primera División's top scorer, in 2020 and 2021 she finished as the top scorer in Europe's top five women's leagues, and in 2021, was the joint-top scorer in that season's UEFA Women's Champions League. At the end of 2021, she finished second in Ballon d'Or voting and was the world's highest female goalscorer of the calendar year with 51 goals.

Hermoso holds the record for the most all-time Pichichi trophies with five. Hermoso also holds the record of the top all-time goalscorer for both FC Barcelona Femení and Spain, achieving the milestones in the years 2020 and 2021, respectively.

Early life
Hermoso grew up playing futsal and seven-a-side football, sharing teams with boys throughout most of her youth.

Hermoso is the granddaughter of Antonio Hernandez, a former goalkeeper of Atlético Madrid. As a child, he would take her to watch Atlético's matches at the Vicente Calderón Stadium. Hermoso arrived at Atlético Madrid at twelve years old with encouragement from her grandfather.

Club career

Atlético Madrid (2004–2010)
After developing with their youth teams, Hermoso made her senior debut for Atlético Madrid in the Segunda División on 5 December 2004, scoring a goal in a 6–0 victory over Vicálvaro. In the 2005–06 season, she played 16 games and scored 12 goals, including the goal that secured Atléti's promotion to the Superliga against UE L'Estartit.

Hermoso left the club in 2010 after spending 8 years with Atlético.

Rayo Vallecano (2010–2013)
Hermoso's signing to Rayo Vallecano was announced on 5 July 2010, alongside 7 other new signings. Rayo, who won the 2009–10 Superliga, were automatically qualified to the 2010–11 UEFA Women's Champions League Round of 32. Hermoso scored her first Champions League goals against Icelandic club Valur. Rayo reached the knockout stages, where they were eliminated by Arsenal. In the final of the 2010–11 Superliga, Rayo Vallecano played RCD Espanyol in a two-legged tie. In the first leg, Hermoso started and scored a penalty which gave Rayo the lead before an equalizer from Veronica Boquete. Hermoso went on to score the tie-winning goal in the return leg, winning her first ever and Rayo's third league title. As of 2021, it is the last major title Rayo have won.

In qualification for the 2011–12 UEFA Women's Champions League, Hermoso scored two goals against Estonian club Pärnu. In the final match of qualifying, Hermoso scored her first Champions League hat-trick against Slovenian team ŽNK Krka. Rayo finished the qualification round with 3 wins from 3 matches to advance to the Round of 32 of the Champions League, where Hermoso scored her first Champions League knockout round goal against Valur in the Round of 32. Rayo were eliminated in the Round of 16, again against Arsenal. In the 2011–12 league season, Rayo achieved fourth place. Hermoso scored the game-winning goal against Barcelona in May 2012, ending their season-long unbeaten streak.

The 2012–13 season started well for Rayo, but results worsened and Hermoso left the team coinciding with the Nueva Rumasa scandal that left Rayo's women's team without financial support.

Tyresö FF (2013)

In 2013, Hermoso left Rayo to join Tyresö FF of the Swedish Damallsvenskan for the 2013 season. Tyresö was Hermoso's first venture outside of Spain, and the first time she was able to play football as a professional.

Hermoso debuted with Tyresö in the Champions League on 9 October against Paris Saint-Germain, where she entered as a substitute for Caroline Graham Hansen. She then played two other Champions League matches with the club, the second against PSG and another against Fortuna Hjørring. Hermoso left the club in December having scored 6 goals in 20 league matches. Tyresö would end up being runners-up in the Damallsvenskan and runners-up in the Champions League.

FC Barcelona (2014–2017)

2013–14 season
At the end of the 2013 Damallsvenskan season, Hermoso contacted then-coach Xavi Llorens to play for FC Barcelona Femení. In January 2014, Hermoso left Tyresö FF to join Barcelona. She signed with a 6-month contract to continue to the end of the 2013–14 season.

On 12 April 2014, Hermoso scored Barcelona's third and final goal in a match against Atlético Madrid, which clinched the club's third league title. On 21 June, Hermoso started the 2014 Copa de la Reina final against Athletic Club Femenino, which went to a penalty shootout after being tied 1-1 in extra time. Hermoso converted her penalty, Barcelona's fourth out of five, and won her first Copa de la Reina trophy.

2014-15 season 
Hermoso was cup-tied with Tyresö for the 2013–14 UEFA Women's Champions League season, and wasn't able to make her debut with Barcelona in the competition until the 2014–15 season. She did so in the Round of 32 against SK Slavia Prague.

On 22 April, 2015, Hermoso won her second league title with Barcelona and her third overall.

2015–16 season
In her second full season at the club, Hermoso moved farther up the pitch to play as a false 9. In doing so, Hermoso began a prolific goalscoring career. She scored her first goal for Barcelona in the Champions League in the Round of 32 return leg against Kazakh side BIIK Kazygurt.

Barcelona made it to the 2016 Copa de la Reina final against Atlético Madrid. Hermoso scored 2 goals and nearly completed a comeback from 3–0, but Barcelona failed to score another and the match ended 3–2 in favor of Atlético. At the end of the season, Hermoso earned her first ever Pichichi title by scoring 24 goals in the league.

2016–17 season

In February 2017, Hermoso was nominated to the 2016 FIFPro Women's World 11 for the first time in her career. She was selected as 9th among the 15 players in the midfielder category. In March 2017, Hermoso scored a header against FC Rosengård in the quarterfinals of the 2016–17 UEFA Women's Champions League to help send Barcelona to their first ever Champions League semifinal. On 2 May, Hermoso scored 6 goals in a single match against Basque side Oiartzun in a 13–0 win, positioning her to finish as top scorer over Atlético Madrid's Sonia Bermúdez. Hermoso ended the league season as the top scorer for the second season in a row, scoring 35 goals in 27 matches.

On 18 June, 2017, in the 2017 Copa de la Reina final, Hermoso scored a brace to win her second such title with the club.

Hermoso scored 77 goals in 90 games in her first 3-year stint at Barcelona.

Paris Saint-Germain (2017–2018)

On 3 July, 2017, after being linked there since January, Hermoso signed a three-year contract with Paris Saint-Germain. At PSG, she was given a deeper role under Patrice Lair and played more as a midfielder than as a forward. She debuted with her new team on September 10 with a 3–0 win over Rodez. Her first goal didn't come until December 17, on matchday 12, again against Rodez.

With PSG she played 19 of the 22 league games, 17 of them as a starter, and scored 6 goals. She was also PSG's assist leader with 7. PSG finished second in Division 1 that season, securing a spot in the 2018–19 UEFA Women's Champions League, and also won the 2017–2018 Coupe de France.

On 10 August 2018, PSG reported a mutual termination of contract with Hermoso, as manager Olivier Echouafni said she was homesick for Spain.

Atlético Madrid (2018–2019)

After playing only one season at Paris Saint-Germain, Hermoso returned to Spain and re-joined Atlético Madrid on 10 August 2018. In her one season back, she was a key player in Atlético winning their third consecutive league title. At the end of the season, Hermoso scored 24 goals with Atletico to earn her first Pichichi title with the club and her third such title overall. In the 2018–19 Copa de la Reina, she was runner-up when Atlético lost to Real Sociedad 2–1 in the final.

Hermoso was named the ninth-best playmaker of 2018 by the International Federation of Football History & Statistics (IFFHS) and the best Spanish player of 2018 by The Guardian. They highlighted her adaptation to Madrid, noting that she had scored in each of Atléti's matchdays except two. She was also chosen to the league's Best XI of the season.

FC Barcelona (2019–2022)

2019–20 season
On 2 July, 2019, Hermoso's return to FC Barcelona was made official after two seasons away from the club. She signed a three-year contract. In her first match back as a Barcelona player, she scored a hat trick within 18 minutes against CD Tacón (now known as Real Madrid Femenino) in the newly-opened Estadi Johan Cruyff. On 1 March 2020, Hermoso scored her 100th league goal with Barcelona with a hat-trick against Madrid CFF.

By May, the COVID-19 pandemic resulted in the cancellation of the 2019–20 league season, and Barcelona were crowned winners with 21 matchdays remaining. Hermoso finished as the league's top scorer with 23 goals, as well as the top scorer in Europe's top five leagues. Hermoso then competed in Barcelona's remaining matches of the 2019–20 UEFA Women's Champions League after it resumed in August, and Barcelona were knocked out in the semifinals against VfL Wolfsburg. At the end of the campaign, Hermoso was named to the UEFA Women's Champions League Squad of the Season for the first time.

Due to the COVID-19 pandemic, the 2019–20 Copa de la Reina was postponed until it could be played again during the 2020–21 season. Hermoso played the final of the 2019–20 Copa de la Reina on 13 February 2021, where she scored Barcelona's third and final goal against EdF Logroño from a header. It was her third Copa de la Reina title win with the club.

2020–21 season
On 5 December, 2020, Hermoso recorded four goals in one match against Santa Teresa CD in the league, scoring her 124th goal with Barcelona and surpassing Sonia Bermúdez as FC Barcelona Femeni's all-time top scorer. She then overtook Bermúdez's record number of 108 league goals scored with Barcelona. At the end of 2020, Hermoso was nominated for FIFA's The Best award, alongside teammate Caroline Graham Hansen. She was also one of eight FCB Femení players nominated for UEFA Women's Team of the Year.

In the first leg of Barcelona's Champions League quarterfinal tie against Manchester City, Hermoso entered the match as a substitute, only recently having been medically cleared. She scored Barcelona's final goal of the match, giving them a 3–0 cushion as they advanced to the semifinals on a 4–2 aggregate score. Barcelona then played Hermoso's former club Paris-Saint Germain in the semifinals, with the first leg taking place at PSG's home ground. Hermoso scored the first goal of the tie in a match that ended in a 1–1 draw. Barcelona then went on to win 2–1 in the home leg, sending them to the club's second ever Champions League final.

On 16 May, Hermoso started the first Champions League final of her career against Chelsea. In the thirteenth minute, Melanie Leupolz made contact with Hermoso in the penalty area. Barcelona were awarded the penalty, which Alexia Putellas scored to give Barcelona a 2–0 lead. Barcelona went on to score 2 more within the next 20 minutes, and they won the final 4–0. Hermoso ended her season as the top scorer in that season's UEFA Women's Champions League, tied with Fran Kirby with six. She was the first Spanish player and the first player from the Spanish league to do so. She was also given a place in that season's UEFA Women's Champions League Squad of the Season, her 2nd such appearance. Later in the year, Hermoso won the UEFA Women's Champions League Forwards of the Season award.

Throughout the 2020–21 season, Hermoso went back and forth as the league's top scorer with Levante's Esther González. The race for the Pichichi title between the two went down to the final matchday of the league. Hermoso, who had 28 league goals to Esther's 29, scored a hat-trick against Eibar to clinch her third consecutive and fifth overall Pichichi title. With this win, she surpassed the record of former Barcelona teammate Sonia Bermúdez, who had four such titles. Hermoso ended her season with 31 league goals and finished as the top scorer in Europe's top five leagues for the second consecutive season. In August 2021, she was named a finalist to the UEFA Women's Player of the Year Award alongside Barcelona teammates Alexia Putellas and Lieke Martens.

2021–22 season
At the beginning of the 2021–22 season, Hermoso regained her "10" shirt number upon the departure of Kheira Hamraoui. Hermoso featured in FCB Femení's first ever Gamper Trophy match against Juventus, where she scored two goals and was player of the match. In November, she finished second in Ballon d'Or voting behind teammate Alexia Putellas.

Hermoso finished the 2021 calendar year with 51 goals in all competitions, the most of any female footballer in the world.

Pachuca (2022–present)
After weeks of speculation about her future, Hermoso signed with Liga MX Femenil club Pachuca on 21 June 2022.

International career

Youth national teams
Hermoso made her debut with Spain's U-19 national team on 12 April, 2007 against Serbia in the second qualifying round for the 2007 U-19 European Championship, where she scored two goals. Hermoso played a total of 4 official matches with Spain's U-19s.

2011–13: Debut and Euro 2013
In September 2011, Hermoso earned her first official call-up for the Spanish national team. She made her senior-team debut on 21 June 2012 against Turkey in a 4–0 victory that allowed Spain to play in the playoffs of the UEFA Women's Euro 2013. Hermoso participated in the play-off against Scotland, in which Spain qualified with a goal in the last minute of extra time. Hermoso played 4 games in the qualifying round. She scored her first national team goal in a friendly against Russia in January 2013.

In June 2013, national team coach Ignacio Quereda confirmed Hermoso as a member of his 23-player squad for the UEFA Women's Euro 2013 finals in Sweden. Hermoso scored her first competitive goal with Spain in their first match of the tournament, which was nearly the match-winner against England in the 85th minute to put Spain 2–1 up. England equalized not soon after but Spain scored the winner in added time to end the match 3–2, and Hermoso was awarded Player of the Match. Spain finished second in their group behind France. In the quarterfinals, they faced tournament runners-up Norway, where Hermoso scored a consolation goal in the 89th minute, as Spain were defeated 3–1.

2014–15: Spain's first Women's World Cup
She participated in all 10 qualifying matches for the 2015 FIFA Women's World Cup in Canada and scored 7 goals, switching between center and attacking midfielder. At the end of the qualifying phase, Spain finished with 9 wins and a draw, qualifying for their first ever Women's World Cup tournament. In May 2015, Hermoso was called up for the tournament. Hermoso played in Spain's debut World Cup match, in which Spain tied 1–1 against Costa Rica. Hermoso did not play the other two matches of the group stage, in which Spain lost and did not qualify for the next round, a disappointing outcome that was criticized by the Spanish press. After the poor results in the World Cup, the 23 players in Spain's squad demanded the resignation of Ignacio Quereda with a collective statement. The players expressed their dissatisfaction with the poor planning of the national team in the trip to Canada, the methodology used with the group, the lack of friendly matches leading up to the tournament, and scarce analysis of the team's rivals by the coach himself. Spain's players refused to play with the national team again if Quereda did not leave, which finally happened on July 30.

2016–17: Euro 2017
Hermoso became a regular starter under Spain's new coach, Jorge Vilda, who advanced her position to striker.
Spain went on an undefeated run in qualification for the 2017 European Championship in the Netherlands. Spain also played in the Algarve Cup in March 2017, a friendly tournament in preparation for the European Championship. Hermoso scored against Norway and won in the final against Canada.

On June 20, 2017, Hermoso was called up by Jorge Vilda to play her second Euro tournament. She started all three group stage games and Spain finished second in the group tied on points with Portugal and Scotland. They just barely managed to reach the quarterfinals with a better goal difference and faced Austria in the quarterfinals. The match went to penalties and Austria won the penalty shoot-out.

2018–19: 2019 FIFA Women's World Cup

In qualifying for the 2019 FIFA Women's World Cup in France, Hermoso directly contributed to goals in each of Spain's matches, accumulating 7 goals and 9 assists. In the second match of qualifiers against Serbia, she made her 50th appearance for the national team. Spain completed the qualifying phase as group winners, winning all matches. In the middle of the qualifying phase, Hermoso played the 2018 Cyprus Women's Cup, in which Spain was champion.

Hermoso was named part of Spain's squad at the 2019 FIFA Women's World Cup in France. She scored twice in the opening game of their campaign against South Africa, with both goals coming from the penalty spot. She was named player of the match as Spain recorded their first ever win in a Women's World Cup tournament.

Spain advanced to the Round of 16 for the first time in a World Cup tournament, and played against the United States. The USA scored within 7 minutes, but Hermoso brought a goal back two minutes later. She scored from outside the box off of a Lucía García assist, who took advantage of a giveaway from USA defender Becky Sauerbrunn. Spain ended up losing the match to the eventual tournament champions after a controversial VAR-awarded penalty, which Hermoso said after the match that she "would not have called".

2020–21: Euro 2021 and becoming Spain's all-time top scorer
On 14 February 2021, Hermoso scored 5 goals in a match against Azerbaijan. Of those five goals was her 41st goal with the Spanish national team, surpassing Veronica Boquete as the team's all-time highest goalscorer. Hermoso ended the qualifying round of the 2022 Euro tournament with 10 goals, the most in Group D.

Style of play
In the beginnings of Hermoso's career, she played deeper than her current position as a forward, and was positioned as either a center midfielder or attacking midfielder. In 2015, under the instruction of Xavi Llorens and Jorge Vilda, Hermoso took up a more offensive role as a center-forward or false 9, which she still plays today. This change allowed her to shift her game from giving assists and creating chances to becoming a prolific goalscorer. As a false 9, Hermoso is at her most productive as a forward when she is given the opportunity to play deeper and roam freely between opposing lines. She regularly switches between her position in the center and either position on the wings, both creating and finding space. Hermoso's free-roaming positional play is key to Barcelona's tactical setup, for it allows her space to receive the ball and create chances. Aside from being their top goalscorer, she has been one of Barcelona's biggest contributors to the team's attack during her two separate stints at the club. With Spain, she has a slightly different tactical role that requires a more intense press and more positional discipline.

Physically, Hermoso is known for her comparatively tall stature of 1.75m (5 ft. 9 in.), which aids in her ability to head in goals and makes her a threat on set pieces. As she is not particularly pacey, she excels when given the opportunity to play slower, possession-based football. She is left footed, but is capable of scoring with either foot. Hermoso is also keen on scoring goals from outside the box.

Patrice Lair, PSG's former manager, defined her as "a very technical and athletic left-footed player. She will be complementary to our attack and she can also play in the midfielder position. We need scorers who can score a lot and this is precisely her profile."

Personal life 
On 2 January 2022, FC Barcelona released a statement that Hermoso had tested positive for COVID-19.

Career statistics

Club

International
Scores and results list Spain's goal tally first, score column indicates score after each Hermoso goal.

Honours
Rayo Vallecano
 Primera División: 2010–11

Barcelona
 Primera División: 2013–14, 2014–15, 2019–20, 2020–21, 2021–22
UEFA Women's Champions League: 2020–21
 Copa de la Reina de Fútbol: 2014, 2017, 2020, 2021
 Supercopa Femenina: 2019–20, 2021–22

Atlético Madrid
 Primera División: 2018–19

Paris Saint-Germain
 Coupe de France Féminine: 2017–18

Spain
 Algarve Cup: 2017
 Cyprus Cup: 2018

Individual
Primera División Top scorer: 2015–16, 2016–17, 2018–19, 2019–20, 2020–21
UEFA Women's Champions League Squad of the Season: 2019–20, 2020–21
UEFA Women's Champions League top scorer: 2020–21
UEFA Champions League Forward of the Season: 2020–21

References

External links
 
 
 
 
 
 Jenni, BDFutbol

1990 births
Living people
Footballers from Madrid
Spanish women's footballers
Women's association football midfielders
Women's association football forwards
Tyresö FF players
Atlético Madrid Femenino players
Rayo Vallecano Femenino players
FC Barcelona Femení players
Paris Saint-Germain Féminine players
Damallsvenskan players
Primera División (women) players
Division 1 Féminine players
Spain women's international footballers
2015 FIFA Women's World Cup players
2019 FIFA Women's World Cup players
Spanish expatriate women's footballers
Spanish expatriate sportspeople in Sweden
Expatriate women's footballers in Sweden
Spanish expatriate sportspeople in Mexico
Expatriate women's footballers in Mexico
C.F. Pachuca (women) footballers
UEFA Women's Euro 2017 players
21st-century Spanish women